Leuze may refer to several places:

Leuze-en-Hainaut, in the province of Hainaut, Belgium
Leuze, a village in the municipality of Éghezée, Namur province, Belgium
Leuze, Aisne, in the department of Aisne, France

Other uses 
 Battle of Leuze, took place on 18 September 1691